The 1999 Coppa Italia Final decided the winner of the 1998–99 Coppa Italia, the major domestic tournament in Italian football.

Played over two legs, it ended 3–3 on aggregate, with Parma beating Fiorentina on the away goals rule. It was Parma's third final and second victory.

First leg

Second leg

References
rsssf.com

Coppa Italia Finals
Coppa Italia Final 1999
Coppa Italia Final 1999